Erica Magnaldi (born 24 August 1992) is an Italian racing cyclist, who currently rides for UCI Women's Continental Team . She rode in the women's road race event at the 2018 UCI Road World Championships.

Major results
2022
 1st  Mountains classification, Setmana Ciclista Valenciana

References

External links
 

1992 births
Living people
Italian female cyclists
People from Cuneo
Mediterranean Games bronze medalists for Italy
Mediterranean Games medalists in cycling
Competitors at the 2018 Mediterranean Games
Cyclists from Piedmont
Sportspeople from the Province of Cuneo